Đorđe Inđić (born January 3, 1975) is a Bosnian Serb football manager and former player that played as midfielder.

Playing career

Club
During his career he played with Bosnian clubs FK Borac Banja Luka, FK Laktaši and FK Sloboda Mrkonjić Grad, Serbian FK Zemun, Slovenian NK Maribor, Ukrainian FC Chernomorets Odessa and FC Spartak Sumy and in France.

Managerial career
After retiring he became coach, and by August 2014 he was coaching FK Sloboda Mrkonjić Grad in the First League of the Republika Srpska.

References

External links
 Djordje Indjić at playerhistory.com
 
 Photo at Banjalukasport
 Fokus.ba
 

1975 births
Living people
Serbs of Bosnia and Herzegovina
Association football midfielders
Bosnia and Herzegovina footballers
FK Borac Banja Luka players
FK Zemun players
NK Maribor players
FC Chornomorets Odesa players
FC Spartak Sumy players
FK Laktaši players
First League of Serbia and Montenegro players
Ukrainian Premier League players
Ukrainian First League players
Premier League of Bosnia and Herzegovina players
First League of the Republika Srpska players
Bosnia and Herzegovina expatriate footballers
Expatriate footballers in Serbia and Montenegro
Bosnia and Herzegovina expatriate sportspeople in Serbia and Montenegro
Expatriate footballers in Slovenia
Bosnia and Herzegovina expatriate sportspeople in Slovenia
Expatriate footballers in Ukraine
Bosnia and Herzegovina expatriate sportspeople in Ukraine
Bosnia and Herzegovina football managers
FK Sloboda Mrkonjić Grad managers